Beyond Infinity may refer to:
"Beyond Infinity", science fiction radio play by Villiers Gerson, aired in 1950 as an episode of Dimension X
Beyond Infinity (short story collection), a collection of science fiction stories by Robert Spencer Carr, published in 1951
Beyond Infinity, alternative title of 1961 science fiction anthology by Alan E. Nourse
Beyond Infinity, the distribution company for the 1987 science fiction comedy film Galactic Gigolo
Beyond Infinity, science fiction novel by Gregory Benford
Beyond Infinity, anime adaption of manga series Babel II
"Beyond Infinity", track on 2008 synth concept album Reality After Midnight by William C. Woxlin
"Beyond Infinity", 2011 Brazilian death metal track by Thyresis
Beyond Infinity (mathematics book), nonfiction book about infinity by Eugenia Cheng, published in 2017

See also
Au-delà de l'Infini [Beyond Infinity], 1952 French science fiction novel by Henri René Guieu
Slave Girls from Beyond Infinity, 1987 science fiction film
To Infinity and Beyond (catchphrase)
To Infinity and Beyond: A Cultural History of the Infinite, 1991 nonfiction book by Eli Maor